The 1997 World Men's Curling Championship (branded as 1997 Ford World Men's Curling Championship for sponsorship reasons) was held at Allmend Stadium in Bern, Switzerland from April 12–20, 1997.

Teams

Round robin standings

Round robin results

Draw 1

Draw 2

Draw 3

Draw 4

Draw 5

Draw 6

Draw 7

Draw 8

Draw 9

Playoffs

Final

References
 

Curling
Ford World Mens Curling Championship, 1997
International curling competitions hosted by Switzerland
International sports competitions hosted by Switzerland
Sports competitions in Bern
World Men's Curling Championship
21st century in Bern
April 1997 sports events in Europe